Vittorio Osvaldo Tommasini, better known by the pen name Farfa, (1879, in Trieste – 1964, in San Remo) was an Italian painter and poet, who joined the Italian Futurism Movement.

References 

1879 births
1964 deaths
20th-century Italian poets
Italian male poets
20th-century Italian male writers